Solang Valley  derives its name from combination of words Solang (Nearby village) and Nallah (water stream). It is a side valley at the top of the Kullu Valley in Himachal Pradesh, India 14 km northwest of the resort town Manali on the way to Rohtang Pass, and is known for its summer and winter sport conditions. The sports most commonly offered are parachuting, paragliding, skating and zorbing.

Giant slopes of lawn comprise Solang Valley and provide its reputation as a popular ski resort. A few ski agencies offering courses and equipment reside here and operate only during winters.

Snow melts during the summer months starting May and skiing is then replaced by zorbing (a giant ball with room for 2 people which is rolled down a 200-metre hill), paragliding, parachuting and horse riding. A Ski Himalayas Ropeway was recently opened.

Gallery

Climate 

The climate in Solang Valley is very cold during winter and moderately chilly during summer.

References

Ski areas and resorts in India
Valleys of Himachal Pradesh
Geography of Kullu district
Manali, Himachal Pradesh